This is a list of banks in Libya which have oversight by the Central Bank of Libya.

See also 
 List of banks in the Arab world

References 

Libya
 
Banks
Libya